The 472nd Fighter Aviation Regiment (Military Unit Number 61364) was a regiment of the Soviet Air Defence Forces, which later came under Russian command. The regiment was formed at the beginning of 1950.

It was formed on 15 May 1950 at Orel at the Oryol Yuzhny Airport, though its formation had begun early 1950. It was relocated to Kursk to Kursk Vostochny Airport ("Eastern") October 4, 1979 (leading the team, the material part), October 7, 1979, and the ground echelon of the regimental banner.

It was based at Orel from 1950 until 4 October 1979, upon which it moved to Kursk, where it was stationed until disbandment on 1 May 1998.

Armament 

 Since the formation of the regiment fighters Yak-17;
 December 1950 with the fighters MiG-15;
 In 1957, the fighters MiG-17 and MiG-19;
 In 1979, the fighters MiG-23P.

Crashes
 On December 27, 1989, Lieutenant Borsch's aircraft suffered engine failure. Airplane pilot led to the village Sapogova and ejected, and the fighter crashed in a field.
 March 3, 1994, during a training flight at MiG-23 Stop the engine. Major Vladimir Zhivolup thrice unsuccessfully tried to start it. The plane and the pilot was planning to try to withdraw fighter from the city. The plane crashed on the outskirts of Kursk and, in a clearing cut through the birch forest and destroying the house number 59 on the street and Bratsk. Wooden house caught fire and the fire destroyed an old woman, and two children pulled from a burning house passing by pochtalonka. The pilot was still alive, and is completely healthy. Nevertheless, according to established tradition held in the hospital for a while. He was discharged with a diagnosis of "Osteochondrosis" and flew on.
 On 8 October 1971 (8.10.1971) Orel Night. SMU. Crash of the Mikoyan-Gurevich MiG-19P piloted by Captain Ivan Nechayev

References 
 History 472nd Fighter Regiment
 Michael Holm, 472nd Fighter Aviation Regiment PVO
 Avikatastrofy in Kursk Region 

Fighter regiments of the Soviet Air Defence Forces
Regiments of the Russian Air Forces
Military units and formations established in 1950
Military units and formations disestablished in 1998